The Shakuntala Express was a passenger train that ran between Yavatmal and Achalpur, in the state of Maharashtra in India.

In 2016, Indian Railways announced that the Shakuntala Express would be cancelled due to the track conversion to  broad gauge. The express service was actually stopped in 2020, and the conversion of tracks to broad-gauge started in same year.

See also 
 Shakuntala Railway

Notes

References

External links 
 Shakuntala Express 52131 indiarailinfo
 Shakuntala Express 52137 indiarailinfo

Defunct trains in India
Rail transport in Maharashtra
Railway services introduced in 1903
Railway services discontinued in 2020